Georges Lech (born 2 June 1945) is a French retired football player. He is of Polish descent.

References

External links
 
 
 http://www.fff.fr/servfff/historique/historique.php?id=LECH%20Georges
 http://www.sitercl.com/Fichejo/L/lechgeor.htm

1945 births
Living people
French footballers
France international footballers
Association football forwards
French people of Polish descent
RC Lens players
FC Sochaux-Montbéliard players
Stade de Reims players
Ligue 1 players